Efthimios "Makis" Triantafillopoulos (born 14 August 1954) is a Greek journalist and publisher. He was, along with Themos Anastasiadis, the publisher of Proto Thema newspaper and host of two television programmes, Zougla and Kitrinos Typos on Alter Channel. He uses his TV programmes to expose political scandals on television, usually using techniques like hidden cameras. He founded his own Sunday-newspaper "VETO" and is the owner of "zougla.gr" (jungle.gr), an internet-newspaper in Greece.

Some of his exposures include the football scandal of the so-called Paranga, the judicial scandal in 2005 (the so-called Paradikastiko) and the Fakelaki amongst the medicines of the National Healthcare Service (ESY) in Greece.

Biography
Triantafillopoulos was born in Thessaloniki in 1954 and is the son of Konstantinos Triantafyllopoulos, a major general in the gendarmerie, who hailed from Leontio in Achaea, and Eugenia. His father, who died in January 2012, was an officer and had served for many years in the personal security detail of the late prime minister Georgios Papandreou, at one point as head of the detail. During the period of the junta, he was court martialed and exiled.
 
His first cousin was Dimitris Trantafyllopoulos, a journalist who had run for political office with New Democracy.
 
He studied at the University of Bologna, Italy, before transferring to the law school of the University of Athens.
 
He worked as a journalist and became known through his television show Zougla (jungle) and “Kitrinos Typos” (yellow journalism) and collaborated with several television stations: New Channel, Star, Skai, Ant1, Alpha, Alter, Zoom, Extra and Epsilon.
 
Along with his broadcast television and publishing activity, he had radio shows and maintains a news website, Zougla.gr. In August 2008, he became vice-president of Iraklis FC.

Career
In 2005, along with Tasos Karamitsos and Themos Anastasiadis, he co-founded the newspaper Proto Thema, the first issue of which was published on 27 February 2015. In March 2008, it was announced that Triantafyllopoulos had sold his share of the newspaper to the Pegasus publishing company of the Bobolas family. 

In November 2009, along with Thanasis Lalas, he issued the weekly newspaper Veto, which shut down in December 2010, due to financial problems. Thanasis Lalas had earlier left the newspaper.

References

Greek television presenters
Greek television journalists
Greek investigative journalists
Living people
Mass media people from Thessaloniki
1954 births
Greek newspaper publishers (people)